Sister Sweetly is the third album by the Colorado rock band Big Head Todd and the Monsters, released in 1993. It was the band's first album with Giant Records. Sister Sweetly sold more than 1,000,000 copies, going platinum.

The album was on the charts for more than a year, but never hit the top half of the Billboard 200, peaking at number 117. The first single was "Broken Hearted Savior". The band supported the album by touring with 4 Non Blondes.

Production
The album was produced by David Z. All of its songs were written by frontman Todd Park Mohr.

Critical reception

Trouser Press called the album "a revelation," writing that "by taking on mostly shorter songs, Mohr forces his writing to be tighter and more economical." The Calgary Herald deemed it "flavorless, emotionless music that`s easy enough to enjoy but just as easy to forget."

Track listing
All songs written by Todd Park Mohr

Personnel
 Todd Park Mohr - vocals, guitar, keyboards
 Rob Squires - bass, backing vocals
 Brian Nevin - drums, percussion, backing vocals
 David Z - additional guitar, additional percussion, producer, mixer, engineer
 Bruce McCabe - piano on track 1
 Jevetta Steele - vocals on track 5
 Leo Kottke - guitar on track 7
 Brian Poer - engineer
 George Marino - mastering
 Ray Hahnfeldt - additional engineer
 Tom Garneau - additional engineer
 Tom Tucker - additional engineer
 John Burris - pre-production engineer
 Jeff Aldrich - A&R
 Janet Levinson - art direction, design
 Melodie McDaniel - photography

References

Big Head Todd and the Monsters albums
1993 albums
Giant Records (Warner) albums